Lars Lönnroth  (born 4 June 1935) is a Swedish literary scholar.

He was born in Gothenburg to Erik Lönnroth and Ebba Lagercrantz.

His academic career includes professorships at the University of California Berkeley,  University of Aalborg and the University of Gothenburg.

Career

Lönnroth gained his first degree at Uppsala University in 1961, and his PhD at Stockholm University in 1965. He became associate professor in Scandinavian Studies at University of California, Berkeley in 1965, and professor in literature and text science at Aalborg University in 1974. From 1982 to 2000, he was professor in literary studies at the University of Gothenburg, with a short break when he was Svenska Dagbladets cultural director from 1991 to 1993. He was chairman of Statens konstnärsnämnd from 1995 to 2001, and chairman of Sällskapet Gnistan from 1999 to 2013.

Lönnroth's research has to a large extent dealt with the  Icelandic medieval fairy tale literature. Together with Sven Delblanc, he was editor of the seven-volume work "Swedish Literature" (1987-90). He has written numerous other books including the 2005 Ljuva karneval! on Sweden's 18th century bard, Carl Michael Bellman. He has published his memoirs and a personal book about his family heritage from the nationalist poet, historian and composer Erik Gustav Geijer onwards, a legacy marked by the "poetry and madness" of the book's subtitle.

Lönnroth was installed in 1993 as an honorary member of the Södermanlands-Nerikes nation in Uppsala. He is an honorary member of the Society of Swedish Literature in Finland, a member of the Royal Norwegian Society of Sciences and Letters, the Royal Gustavus Adolphus Academy, and the Royal Society of Arts and Sciences in Gothenburg.

Reception

Reviewing the Festschrift written in his honour in 2000, Ulf Malm described Lönnroth as "the energetically combative and polemically gifted literature professor from Gothenburg".

Ljuva karneval!

In Ljuva karneval!, written after some 40 years of research, Lönnroth dispels the dominant 200 year old myth created by Johan Henric Kellgren that Bellman was always speaking for himself in his best-known work, Fredman's Epistles. The book explains that the reverse was the case; Bellman uninterruptedly played carefully-crafted roles, including troubadour, court dramatist, and satirist. The book presents Bellman as a skilful performance artist with an experimental, genre-crossing creativity. Fredman's Epistles necessarily take a central place in the book, but it offers much fresh detail on Bellman's lesser-known works, such as Bacchi Tempel.

Family

Lars is the brother of the politician Johan Lönnroth, the nephew of the author Olof Lagercrantz, and cousin of the actress Marika Lagercrantz and the journalist and author David Lagercrantz.

Works

In English 

 1965 – European Sources of Icelandic Saga-Writing
 1976 – Njáls saga: A Critical Introduction
 1977 – The Riddles of the Rök-Stone: A Structural Approach 
 2011 – The Academy of Odin: Selected Papers on Old Norse Literature

In Swedish 

 1961 – Litteraturforskningens dilemma
 1978 – Den dubbla scenen 
 1983 – Faust i Göteborg
 1996 – Skaldemjödet i berget
 2001 – Tegnér och det nordiskt sublima
 2005 – Ljuva Karneval! Om Carl Michael Bellmans diktning
 2006 – Njals saga (translation, introduction)
 2009 – Dörrar till främmande rum. Minnesfragment 
 2017 – Det germanska spåret. En västerländsk litteraturtradition från Tacitus till Tolkien
 2019 – Geijerarvet. En släkthistoria om dikt och galenskap

Translations 

 1995 – Isländska mytsagor (with commentary)
 2014 – Laxdalingarnas saga 
 2016 – Den poetiska Eddan (with introduction and commentary)

Awards and distinctions 

  1971 – Guggenheim Fellow
  1986 – Schück prize from the Swedish Academy
  1995 – Rettig prize
  2000 – 
  2005 – Dobloug prize
  2005 – John Landquist prize
  2007 – Knight of the Order of the Falcon (Iceland)
  2008 – Nils Ahnlund prize
  2016 – Swedish Academy's Extra prize
 2021 - Honorary doctorate at Háskóli Íslands (Iceland's University)

References

1935 births
Living people
Uppsala University alumni
Academic staff of Aalborg University
Academic staff of the University of Gothenburg
Translators of the Poetic Edda
Carl Michael Bellman scholars